Viktor Ivanovich Kratasyuk (January 30, 1949  – March 18, 2003) was a Soviet-born Georgian sprint canoer who competed in the early 1970s. He won a gold medal in the K-2 1000 m event at the 1972 Summer Olympics in Munich.

Born in Poti, Georgian SSR.

References
Sports-reference.com profile

1949 births
2003 deaths
People from Poti
Canoeists at the 1972 Summer Olympics
Male canoeists from Georgia (country)
Soviet male canoeists
Olympic canoeists of the Soviet Union
Olympic gold medalists for the Soviet Union
Olympic medalists in canoeing
Honoured Masters of Sport of the USSR

Medalists at the 1972 Summer Olympics